Harri Hilmer Huhtala (born August 13, 1952 in Paattinen) is a former hammer thrower from Finland, who competed in three consecutive Summer Olympics for his native country, starting in 1980.

Achievements

References
sports-reference

1952 births
Living people
Sportspeople from Turku
Finnish male hammer throwers
Athletes (track and field) at the 1980 Summer Olympics
Athletes (track and field) at the 1984 Summer Olympics
Athletes (track and field) at the 1988 Summer Olympics
Olympic athletes of Finland